Invasion Quartet is a 1961 British World War II comedy-drama film that was publicised as a parody of The Guns of Navarone. It was directed by Jay Lewis and starred Bill Travers and Spike Milligan.

Plot
Two wounded officers, one British and one French are deemed unfit and surplus to requirements.  They abscond from their hospital and, together with an explosives expert suffering from mental illness, and a Colonel, thought too old to serve in the Army, make their way to France to destroy a long range German artillery piece.

The plot has similarities to the exploits of Commando Sgt Peter King and Pte Leslie Cuthbertson.

Cast
 Bill Travers as Freddie Oppenheimer
 Spike Milligan as Godfrey Pringle 
 Grégoire Aslan as Debrie 
 John Le Mesurier as Colonel
 Thorley Walters as Cummings 
 Maurice Denham as Dr. Barker
 Thelma Ruby as Matron 
 Millicent Martin as Kay 
 Cyril Luckham as Col. Harbottle 
 William Mervyn as Naval Officer
 Peter Swanwick as Gun Commander
 Alexander Archdale as Brigadier, War Office
 Gerald Case as Medical Board Officer - (uncredited)
 Ernst Ulman as German Sergeant
 John Wood (English actor) as Duty Officer, War Office
 Richard Marner as German Soldier (uncredited)
 Bernard Hunter as Coding Officer, War Office

Reception
According to MGM records, the film made a loss of $119,000.

See also
Two Men Went to War

References

External links
 

1961 films
1961 comedy-drama films
Metro-Goldwyn-Mayer films
1960s English-language films
Films based on military novels
British World War II films
British war films
1960s war adventure films
Military humor in film
British black-and-white films
Films scored by Ron Goodwin
Films with screenplays by John Briley
Films shot at MGM-British Studios
1960s British films